Tethea albicostata is a moth in the family Drepanidae. It is found in western, north-eastern, northern and central China (Heilongjiang, Jilin, Hebei, Beijing, Shaanxi, Gansu, Jiangsu, Zhejiang, Hubei, Hunan), Korea, the Russian Far East and Japan. The habitat consists of mixed broad-leaved-coniferous forests and oak woods.

References

Moths described in 1861
Thyatirinae